Handbal Club Dinamo Bitcoin București, also known as HC Dinamo Bitcoin București or HC Dinamo Bitcoin, is a women's handball team based in Bucharest, Romania. They are sponsored by Bitcoin.

Kits

Players

Current squad
 

Goalkeepers
 12  Florina Mădălina Bălan
 22  Isabela Roșca
  Gabriela Dobre Vasile
Wingers
RW
 6  Florența Ilie
LW
 7  Camelia Carabulea 
 14  Diana Predoi

Line players

 30  Manuela Manda

Backs
LB

 10  Raluca Petruș
 29  Adina Grigoraș
  Cristina Predoi
CB

 77  Andreea Popa

Transfers
''Transfers for the 2017-2018

Joining

Leaving
  Caroline Martins to ( Molde Elite)

Personnel

Current technical staff

References

External links
  

 

Romanian handball clubs
Handball
Handball clubs established in 2016
CS Dinamo București (women's handball)
Sport in Bucharest
2016 establishments in Romania
Women's handball in Romania